Miami Dade FC is an American soccer team based in Miami, Florida. The club was founded in 2014 and is currently competing in United Premier Soccer League. In November 2015, the club made international headlines by announcing that former Brazil national football team captain Emerson Ferreira da Rosa was joining the club.

History

2014: Miami Dade FC is born 
The team's franchise rights for the NAL were purchased by the investment company, Linck Group, on May 1, 2014.

Miami Dade Football Club, LLC was registered with the Florida State Department on May 1, 2014, and on May 20 the team was officially announced as the 5th NAL Florida conference franchise.

Ginga Scout was announced to be MDFC inaugural jersey sponsor in an event at 1826 Lounge in Miami Beach on May 20, 2014, at the same event which revealed the club's first ever jersey design.

Miami Dade FC debuted in the NAL on May 30, 2014, in a match against Nacional SC, winning the match 3 to 1. Players Andres Perez and Kaique Negri scored the club's first winning goals.

On July 26, Miami Dade FC was crowned NAL champions after defeating Santos USA.

2015-2016: New league 
On March 12, Miami Dade FC announces that they will be part of the new league APSL, starting in April, 2015.

Miami Dade FC were defeated in the semi finals against Boca Raton FC therefore being eliminated, and ending their inaugural season in the APSL.

In May 2016, Miami Dade FC played its first match against a National Team. The game was a Copa America 2016 preparation match against Haiti national football team at the IMG Academy in Bradenton, FL. The game ended 4x1 for  Haiti national football team.

The Miami Dade FC found immediate success in the APSL, winning the 2016 Regular Season Championship with a 5–2–0 (Win-Draw-Loss) record.

2017: Champions 
With former Brazil national football team players Emerson Ferreira da Rosa and Gabriel Rodrigues dos Santos, Miami Dade FC won the 2017 Regular Season Championship undefeated.

2018 to 2020 
In 2018, Miami Dade FC joined the United Premier Soccer League. During their first season, the club managed to qualify to the playoffs but failed to advance to the final. In 2019 Miami Dade FC failed to qualify to the playoffs, finishing 10th in the standings.

Miami Dade FC participated of the 2018 Campeonato Carioca of Beach Soccer. The tournament was founded in 1906, and feature traditional Brazilian teams such as Flamengo and Vasco da Gama. Miami Dade FC finish 3rd in their group, and did not qualify for the finals.

On July 29, 2019, Miami Dade FC took 2nd place at the Svema Karlstad Trophy in Sweden, after losing against FBK Karlstad in the final.

2021 to Present 
On May 2, 2021, Miami Dade FC was crown champions of the Top Tour Tournament at the Estadio Cuauhtémoc in Puebla, Mexico after defeating Cafessa in the final. The tournament trophy was handed by former Mexico National Team captain Carlos Salcido.

Club culture 

The Miami Dade FC name comes from the Dade County, which was created on January 18, 1836, under the Territorial Act of the United States. The county was named after Major Francis L. Dade, a soldier killed in 1835 in the Second Seminole War, at what has since been named the Dade Battlefield. At the time of its creation, Dade County included the land that now contains Palm Beach and Broward counties, together with the Florida Keys from Bahia Honda Key north and the land of present-day Miami-Dade County. The county seat was originally at Indian Key in the Florida Keys; then in 1844, the County seat was moved to Miami. The Florida Keys from Key Largo to Bahia Honda were returned to Monroe County in 1866. In 1888 the county seat was moved to Juno, near present-day Juno Beach, Florida, returning to Miami in 1899. In 1909, Palm Beach County was formed from the northern portion of what was then Dade County, and then in 1915, Palm Beach County and Dade County contributed nearly equal portions of land to create what is now Broward County. There have been no significant boundary changes to the county since 1915.

Reality TV Show 
Miami Dade FC participated in the reality TV Show, (Sueño Fútbol) in which Scouts of Miami Dade FC had to pick one player out of 25,000 trialists. Produced by RCN Televisión, The show's first episode was aired on March 6, 2016, with a 3.2 rating.

In February 2021, Miami Dade FC participated on the TV Show Camino Al Gol picking one winner out of 5,000 players.

Affiliation 

In February 2016, Miami Dade FC announced 2 franchises. Miami Dade FC Macae which is located in Rio de Janeiro, Brazil and Miami Dade FC Barranquilla which is located in Barranquilla, Colombia. In 2019 Miami Dade FC announce their new franchise BIFA in Ho Chi Minh, Vietnam and Miami Dade FC RJ, located in Rio de Janeiro, Brazil.

Colors and badge 

On May 5, 2014, Miami Dade FC announced its selection of official club badge and colors, choosing to be represented by a palm tree and ocean, as well as blue and yellow as its primary colors.

Team kit
MDFC has as its primary colors white and black. The second uniform is Blue and white.
MDFC will launch a full collection of kits once a year, Its schedule to launch in the second quarter, including also goalkeeper, training and travel kits.

 Home colors – White;
 Away colors – Blue;
 Training – Gray;
 Goalkeeper– Green.

Sponsorship
{| class="wikitable" style="text-align: center"
|-
! style="background:#000000; color:white; border:2px solid #A08B58;"|Period
! style="background:#000000; color:white; border:2px solid #A08B58;"|Kit manufacturer
! style="background:#000000; color:white; border:2px solid #A08B58;"|Shirt sponsor
|-
| 2014–2020
| rowspan="1" | Adidas
| Ginga Scout
|-
|-
| 2021-Present
| rowspan="1" | SQ Apparel
| Ginga ScoutSee TV NetworkSiva+VitadermCouto & SilvaISA|}

Charitable work
On Thanksgiving Day, a half-dozen of the Miami-Dade FC team's players and staff spent an afternoon making pasta at the Fort Lauderdale factory of Spaghetto, which manufactures fresh pasta, to then cook and donate to over 150 homeless.

In July 2015, the United Nations presented Miami Dade FC in Barranquilla, Colombia in an event held at Estadio Metropolitano in front of 15,000 fans, an award for peace against drugs and offense in the world.

Current roster

Notable former playersThis list of former players includes those who received international caps while playing for the team, made significant contributions to the team in terms of appearances or goals while playing for the team, or who made significant contributions to the sport either before they played for the team, or after they left. It is clearly not yet complete and all inclusive, and additions and refinements will continue to be made over time.''List  Bryan Arguez (2014)
  Rodrigo Alvim (2014)
  Paulinho Le Petit (2014)
  Gabriel Hoyos (2014)
  Tiago Fernandes (2014)
  Diego Serna (2015)
  Kerlon (2015)
  Teslim Fatusi (2016)
  Rafinha (2018)

Top goal scorers

Last updated: June 23, 2022.
Bolded players are currently on the Miami Dade FC roster.
List  only includes stats from 2014 to present

 Team management 

On December 11, 2013, Joao Garcia was announced as the first head coach of the new franchise, Garcia's official unveiling was made at a press conference on May 27, 2014.

{|class="wikitable"
|-
! style="background:#fff; color:#000;" scope="col" colspan="2"|Executive
|-

|-

|-

|-

|-

|-

! style="background:#fff; color:#000;" scope="col" colspan="2"|Coaching staff

|-

|-

|-

|-

|-

International Friendlies

Honours

 Domestic 

 League NALChampions (1): 2014APSLRegular Season Champions (1): 2016Regular Season Champions (1): 2017APSL Champions (1): 2017National Soccer League (1): 2022

 Worldwide United Nations Award - UNODC - Respira Paz (2015): Por su compromisso en la lucha contra la esclavitud del siglo XXISvema Karlstad Trophy – Runners-up (2nd Place) (2019)Top Tour Mexico''' – Champions (2021)

Club Records

Record national attendance 8,133 v Cruzeiro, Tour of Champions, 2014
Record international attendance 15,642 v Uniautonoma, Respira Paz, 2015
Record victory 13–0 v South Florida FC, NAL, 2014
Record defeat 2–7 v Hurricane FC, UPSL, 2019

See also 
 US Club Soccer
 Lamar Hunt U.S. Open Cup
 CONCACAF Champions League

References

External links 

 

Association football clubs established in 2014
2014 establishments in Florida
Soccer clubs in Miami
Soccer clubs in South Florida
American Premier Soccer League
United Premier Soccer League